Derek Volker,  (born 1939) is a retired senior Australian public servant.

Life and career
Born in 1939, Volker was educated at Toowoomba State High School and the University of Queensland.

Volker's early Australian Public Service career was in the Department of Labour and the Department of Immigration and Ethnic Affairs.

Prime Minister Malcolm Fraser appointed Volker as Secretary of the Department of Veterans' Affairs in 1981, with the mandate to clean up the administration of the department.

In 1986, Prime Minister Bob Hawke transferred Volker to a position as Secretary the Department of Social Security (DSS). In his time at DSS, Volker had to deal with the pressures of the recession and its impact on Social Security offices, including long queues and increasing tension.

Prime Minister Paul Keating announced Volker's transfer from the Department of Social Security to the Department of Employment, Education and Training in March 1993.

In 1996, Volker was one of six Secretaries removed from their roles by the newly elected Howard Government. Political scientist Richard Mulgan speculates that Volker's removal was a result of Prime Minister John Howard's "determination to impose a new sense of direction" on the public service".

After leaving the Australian Public Service, Volker stayed in the workforce and took on various senior roles in both government and non-government organisations, including as Chairman at the Government Relations Group in the national law firm Corrs Chambers Westgarth, Chair of the ACT Government's Skills Commission, and Chairman of the Defence Housing Australia Board of Directors.

Awards
In January 1991, Volker was made an Officer of the Order of Australia for public service.

References

Living people
1939 births
Australian public servants
Officers of the Order of Australia
Secretaries of the Australian Government Education Department
Secretaries of the Australian Government Veterans' Affairs Department
People educated at Toowoomba State High School
University of Queensland alumni